The St. Paul's Episcopal Church in Henderson, Kentucky is a historic church at 5 South Green Street. It was built in 1859-60 and added to the National Register of Historic Places in 1978.

It was described in its National Registration as "architecturally significant in being a chaste yet tasteful example of the universal adaption of the Gothic Revival by Anglican churches throughout the latter half of the nineteenth century."

It is a contributing property in the National Register-listed South Main and South Elm Streets Historic District.

References

External links

Episcopal church buildings in Kentucky
Churches on the National Register of Historic Places in Kentucky
Gothic Revival church buildings in Kentucky
Churches completed in 1860
19th-century Episcopal church buildings
National Register of Historic Places in Henderson County, Kentucky
1860 establishments in Kentucky
Individually listed contributing properties to historic districts on the National Register in Kentucky
Henderson, Kentucky